Bedford Rowing Club is an amateur rowing club in Bedford, United Kingdom founded in 1886.

History
Despite Bedford Regatta having been founded in 1853, there is no record of any rowing clubs in Bedford until 1886. Bedford Rowing Club was founded on 15 March 1886 at a meeting chaired by the Mayor. It was minuted that:
 That it be advisable that a Rowing Club be formed in Bedford.
 That it be called the Bedford Amateur Rowing Club.
 That amateurs only, as defined by the rules of the Amateur Rowing Association, be eligible to become members.
 That a Committee be elected by the meeting to draw up Rules for the Club & amount of subscriptions.
 That all members be swimmers.

The original minutes are held in the Bedfordshire archives; a copy is on display in the Club. The colours are maroon, white and blue.

Current activities 
The club regularly competes across the UK at all levels and has a broad membership base, from complete novices and juniors through to senior oarsmen and veterans.

Competitions 
The club hosts three Head Races each year as well as a popular Sprint Regatta:
 The Eights & Fours Head is held on the second Sunday in February.
 The Spring Small Boats Head is usually held on the second Sunday in April, though the date may be changed, depending on when Easter is celebrated.
 The Sprint Regatta is held on the Sunday between Henley Royal Regatta and the National Championships.
 The Autumn Small Boats Head is held on the second Sunday in October.

Honours

British champions

References

External links 
 Bedford Rowing Club

Rowing clubs in England
1886 establishments in England
Sports clubs established in 1886
Sport in Bedford
Rowing clubs of the River Great Ouse